Mickel is a surname. Notable people with the surname include:

Andrew Mickel (born 1979), former resident of Springfield, Ohio
Finlay Mickel (born 1977), Scottish skier
John Mickel (born 1971), stock car racer and commentator
John Mickel (politician) (born 1953), Australian politician